The 5th Vietnamese Parachute Battalion (Fr: 5e bataillon de parachutistes vietnamiens) was a French-Vietnamese paratroop battalion formed in Hanoi, French Indochina in 1953.

Operational history 
The 5th Vietnamese Parachute Battalion (5 BPVN) was one of five battalions of Vietnamese paratroopers raised by the French Army between 1951 and 1954 as part of General Jean de Lattre de Tassigny's policy to establish a Vietnamese Army. Its cadre was drawn from 3rd and 23rd Indochinese companies of the 3rd Colonial Commando Parachute Battalion (3 BCCP).

The battalion participated in Operation Pike (September - October 1953), Operation Castor (November 1953) and the Battle of Dien Bien Phu.

Commanding officers 
 Capitaine Jacques Bouvery (September 1953 - December 1953)
 Commandant André Botella (December 1953 - May 1954)
 Capitaine Tholy  (June 1954 - July 1954)
 Capitaine Lesaux  (July 1954)

Sources 
 Hell In A Very Small Place - Bernard Fall (1966)

See also 

 1st Cambodian Parachute Regiment
 1st Laotian Parachute Battalion

Military units and formations of the First Indochina War
Vietnam
Vietnam
Vietnamese Parachute Battalion
Vietnamese Parachute Battalion
Vietnamese Parachute Battalion
Vietnamese Parachute Regiment
Vietnamese Parachute Battalion
Vietnamese Parachute Battalion